Clearwater, Florida, held a general election on March 17, 2020, to elect a mayor and two members of the city council (seat 2 and 3). These elections coincided with the Democratic and Republican presidential preference primaries.

Background 
The Clearwater City Council consists of a mayor and four council members, who each serve four-year terms. Incumbent mayor George Cretekos, who was first elected in 2012 and re-elected unopposed in 2016, was ineligible to run for re-election to a third consecutive term.

City council elections were held for seat 2 (held by Jay Polglaze) and seat 3 (held by Bob Cundiff).

Issues raised throughout these elections included the proposal of a new amphitheater downtown, diversity in city government, rights of nature, and Scientology. The COVID-19 pandemic in Florida began two weeks before the elections, which raised concerns for the safety of in-person voters and poll workers.

Mayor

Candidates
 Elizabeth "Sea Turtle" Drayer, retired attorney and former EPA employee     
 Frank Hibbard, former two-term Clearwater mayor (2005-2012)    
 Bill Jonson, former four-term Clearwater city councilmember (2001-2007, 2010–2018)      
 Morton Myers, multiple small business owner, Clearwater native

Endorsements

Fundraising
Upon the launch of her campaign, Drayer pledged not to accept any money contributions, saying "The sea turtle cannot be bought." She led the first campaign fundraising numbers between September 19 to September 30, with a $20,000 personal check from herself; Hibbard raised $19,950 (including $1,000 of his own money); Jonson raised $6,370.20, including a $5,000 personal loan and a $20.20 cash contribution; and Myers did not report any fundraising numbers, as he filed to run after the first fundraising report deadline. It was subsequently reported that Myers had raised $2,100 (all from himself via a personal loan) before November.

Hibbard and Jonson, the two former officeholders in the race, were the only candidates who raised money in November, earning $8,926 and $6,785 respectively; this raised Hibbard's total to $100,419 and Jonson's total to $20,475.40. As of a January article from Tampa Bay Times, Hibbard reportedly raised $110,469 total, while Jonson raised $25,340 total. Drayer and Myers, the two non-politicians in the race, continued to self-fund their campaigns, with earned totals of $20,000 and $3,100 respectively (the former's total remaining the same since September). As of January, Hibbard had earned 25% of his donations from businesses, compared to Jonson's 9%; however Jonson led Hibbard in individual donations from Clearwater residents. Hibbard has earned donations from powerful political and wealthy figures such as Florida State Senator Ed Hooper, DEX Imaging CEO Daniel Doyle Jr., and political action committees associated with Jack and Chris Latvala.

Results

City council elections

Seat 2
Incumbent councilmember Jay Polglaze declined to run for a new term.

Candidates
 Mark Bunker, filmmaker and critic of the Church of Scientology     
 Michael "Mike" Mannino, small business owner and local soccer coach  
 Bruce Rector, attorney, author and businessman  
 Eliseo Santana Jr., United States Army veteran and retired Pinellas County Sheriff's Office tech worker  
 Lina Teixeira, small business owner and fashion designer

Endorsements

Results

Seat 3

Candidates
 Kathleen Beckman, retired teacher 
 Robert "Dr. Bob" Cundiff, incumbent Clearwater city councilmember (since 2016) 
 Bud Elias, small business owner 
 Scott R. Thomas, former two-term Pottsville, Pennsylvania school board member and human resources director

Endorsements

Results

References

Notes

Citations

External links
 City Elections maintained by City of Clearwater, FL (archived) 
 Mayoral campaign websites (archived) 
 Elizabeth "Sea Turtle" Drayer
 Frank Hibbard
 Bill Jonson
 Morton Myers
 City council seat 2 campaign websites (archived)
 Mark Bunker
 Michael "Mike" Mannino
 Bruce Rector
 Eliseo Santana Jr.
 Lina Teixeira
 City council seat 3 campaign websites (archived)
 Kathleen Beckman
 Robert "Dr. Bob" Cundiff
 Bud Elias
 Scott Thomas

Clearwater
Clearwater municipal
Clearwater
Clearwater 2020
Elections 2020
Clearwater 2020
Clearwater municipal elections